Filsen is a municipality in the district of Rhein-Lahn, in Rhineland-Palatinate, in western Germany.

References

External links

Picture of Filsen, J.F. Dielmann, A. Fay, J. Becker (painter): F.C. Vogels Panorama des Rheins, Bilder des rechten und linken Rheinufers, Lithographische Anstalt F.C. Vogel, Frankfurt 1833
Picture of Filsen 2, dito
Picture of Filsen 3, dito

Municipalities in Rhineland-Palatinate
Rhein-Lahn-Kreis